Index Fund Advisors (IFA) is a registered investment advisor (RIA) headquartered in Irvine, California, with representatives in several locations across the United States. The company was founded on March 5, 1999 by Mark T. Hebner, former president of nuclear pharmacy company Syncor International, with the goal of providing online automated investment adviser services, with a personal touch as needed, while also providing educational material regarding investing to the general public through the website IFA.com.

IFA offers high-net-worth individuals, 401k plans, 403b plans, foundations, and endowments of an expanding range of advisory services that are consistent with IFA's investment strategy of passive management. Heavily influenced by the works of Nobel Laureates Eugene Fama,  Harry Markowitz, Paul Samuelson, William F. Sharpe, Merton Miller, Daniel Kahneman and Friedrich von Hayek, IFA advises clients to invest in low-cost index mutual funds, such as those provided by Dimensional Fund Advisors, Vanguard or Blackrock's iShares. Additionally, IFA offers advice on faith-based and sustainable investments, through its IFAsustainable.com and InvestingforCatholics.com sites.

IFA pioneered the idea of the Robo-Advisor when it first published their website on November 9, 1999 as indexfundsadvisors.com, then IFA.tv and finally as IFA.com. Mark Hebner pioneered the business model of a low-cost online Registered Investment Adviser which would provide an online algorithm-based risk capacity survey designed to match individual investors with one of several index portfolios. These portfolios have always been implemented exclusively with index funds. The process of becoming an IFA client has not required face to face meetings and there has been minimal human intervention. IFA was among the first RIAs to offer an online live advisor camera (streaming video and NetMeeting) and live chat.  Since 1999, IFA clients have been offered portfolio rebalancing, tax loss harvesting, tax-management, asset location, extensive online education and historical index and index portfolio risk and return data.

In 2012, IFA built its own in-house TV studio and produces videos that are published on iTunes, YouTube, Roku, and IFA.tv (352 videos as of August 2016). One of the world's largest private collections of financial books can be found at IFA, with about 2,494 books dating back to 1648. The books are catalogued and displayed on IFA.com.

Mark Hebner is also the author of Index Funds: The 12-Step Recovery Program for Active Investors, a book on behavioral finance, the failure of active management and the advantages of passive investing. The book was first published in 2005 and its latest update was published in 2015. Together these various media endeavors advance Hebner's mission to get investors all over the world to stop actively investing their investment portfolios.

IFA's investing philosophy is based on Nobel prize-winning academic and empirical research, including the efficient-market hypothesis, multi-factor asset pricing models, such as the Fama-French Three-Factor Model and more generally modern portfolio theory. IFA rejects the investment strategies generally known as active management. These strategies include stock picking, market timing, manager selection and tactical asset allocation.

IFA reached $3.84 billion in assets under management on 12/31/2017. According to Forbes, IFA was one of the 100 fastest growing RIA Firms, in 2016.

See also 
Enhanced indexing
Efficient-market hypothesis
Dimensional Fund Advisors
Robo-Advisor

References

External links 
Official Website
Index Funds: The 12-Step Recovery Program for Active Investors

1999 establishments in California
Companies based in Irvine, California
Financial services companies established in 1999
Financial advisors
Investment management companies of the United States